The 1930 Coupe de France Final was a football match held at Stade Olympique Yves-du-Manoir, Colombes on April 27, 1930, that saw FC Sète defeat RC Paris 3–1 thanks to goals by Alexandre Friedmann and Yvan Bek (2).

Match details

See also
Coupe de France 1929-1930

External links
Coupe de France results at Rec.Sport.Soccer Statistics Foundation
Report on French federation site

Coupe
1930
Coupe De France Final 1930
Coupe De France Final 1930
Sport in Hauts-de-Seine
Coupe de France Final
Coupe de France Final